Orla Cotter (born 1988 in Cork) is a Camogie player and student, winner of All-Ireland Camogie medals in 2006, 2008, 2009, 2014, 2015, 2017 and 2018. and Camogie All Star awards in 2008, 2014, 2015, 2016 and 2017. Captained the Cork Minor team in 2006, having won an All-Ireland Under-16 medal three years earlier. She has won two Senior All- Ireland medals and made history in 2006 when she became the first player to collect Senior and Senior 'B' honours in the same year. Orla holds titles with her club from Under-14 to Senior as well as All-Ireland Junior Colleges honours and Senior and Junior National League medals. Her sister, Fiona, was on the Cork Under-16 team in 2008.

References

External links 
 Official Camogie Website
 Cronin’s championship diary in On The Ball Official Camogie Magazine
 https://web.archive.org/web/20091228032101/http://www.rte.ie/sport/gaa/championship/gaa_fixtures_camogie_oduffycup.html Fixtures and results] for the 2009 O'Duffy Cup
 All-Ireland Senior Camogie Championship: Roll of Honour
 Video highlights of 2009 championship Part One and part two
 Video Highlights of 2009 All Ireland Senior Final
 Report of All Ireland final in Irish Times Independent and Examiner

Cork camogie players
1988 births
Living people
Date of birth missing (living people)
UCC camogie players